Julien Raimond (1744 – 1801) was a Saint Dominican indigo planter in the French colony of Saint-Domingue, now the Republic of Haiti, who became a leader in its revolution and the formation of Haiti.

Early activism
He was born a free man of color, the son of a French colonist and the colored daughter of a planter, in the isolated Sud province of the colony. His mother, Marie Bagasse, was significantly wealthier and more educated than his father, Pierre Raimond, providing an economic incentive for their interracial marriage. Raimond was a slave owner, as many free people of color from the colony were. He owned over 100 slaves by the 1780s and was one of the wealthiest men in his racial class in the colony.  But he is most famous for challenging the French government to reform racially discriminatory laws against free people of color in Saint-Domingue. In 1785 he moved to France to pursue this quest at the French Colonial Ministry.

The outbreak of the French Revolution in 1789, in particular the publication of the Declaration of the Rights of Man and of the Citizen, prompted Raimond to take his case before the National Constituent Assembly. Working with Vincent Ogé, Henri Grégoire and the Society of the Friends of the Blacks (of which he was eventually elected leader), Raimond succeeded in making the question of equal rights for free people of color into the leading colonial question before the National Assembly in 1790 and 1791.

Laws

On 15 May 1791, the French legislature passed racial reforms urged by Raimond giving wealthy free-born men of color the right to vote in the colonies. But White colonists' resistance to this change provoked civil war in Saint-Domingue. The fragmentation of colonial society that occurred as a result of these racial disputes exacerbated tensions, leading to August 1791 when slaves organized the massive revolt that eventually became the Haitian Revolution.

Raimond published about two dozen political pamphlets in France. One piece entitled Observations on the Origin and Progression of the White Colonists' Prejudice against Men of Color, attempts to describe the racial history of the prejudice on the small island for the purpose of garnering sympathies from the National Assembly. In his other works, he lays out plans for the gradual emancipation of France's colonial slaves. His projects were surpassed when France's Commissioner Léger-Félicité Sonthonax recognized the freedom of the rebels before Raimond's plans were put into action. Raimond eventually returned twice to Saint-Domingue, once with Sonthonax, as an agent of the Revolutionary government, helping re-establish the plantation system after the end of slavery. Though a long advocate of loyalty to France, Raimond ultimately allied with Toussaint L'Ouverture and was one of 10 men who served on a committee that wrote a self-governing Constitution for Saint-Domingue in 1801. Raimond died shortly after the document was published at the age of 57. Although most of Julien Raimond's political activity took place in Paris, his activism on behalf of free people of color and later all Haitians, played a very significant role in the Haitian Revolution. He was different from other colonial activists for racial change because he never fought physically but instead with his writings and political essays. Raimond represented a different and more conservative element of mixed-race Haiti that was finally persuaded to support the Haitian Revolution.

References

Sources
 Cook, Mercer. 1941. Julien Raimond. The Journal of Negro History 26, no. 2: 139–170.
 Cauna, Jacques de, 1992, Julien Raimond, un quarteron d'origine landaise à la tête de la révolution des gens de couleur à Saint-Domingue, dans Actes du colloque Les Landes et la Révolution, 29-30 Sept. 1989, publié par le Conseil Général des Landes, Mont-de-Marsan, 1992, p. 125-135.
 Cauna, Jacques de, 1998, Origines et ascension des gens de couleur : la famille Raimond, et Une élite aquitaine de sang-mêlés, Julien Raimond, un mulâtre landais chef de file des hommes de couleur, dans L'Eldorado des Aquitains. Gascons, Basques et Béarnais aux Îles d'Amérique (17e-18e s.), p. 188-198 et 384–387.
 Dubois, Laurent. 2004. Avengers of the New World: The Story of the Haitian Revolution. Harvard University Press.
Dubois, Laurent, and John D. Garrigus. Slave Revolution in the Caribbean 1789–1804. Boston: Bedford/St. Martin's, 2006. 18–22, 78–82. Print.
 Garrigus, John D. 2007. Opportunist or Patriot? Julien Raimond (1744–1801) and the Haitian Revolution. Slavery & Abolition 28, no. 1: 1–21.
 Raimond, Julien. 1789. Observations adressées à l'Assemblée Nationale par un deputé des colons américains. Paris.
 Raimond, Julien. 1791. Observations sur l'origine et les progrès du préjugé des colons blancs contre les hommes de couleur. Paris: Belin.

French abolitionists
Haitian people of French descent
Haitian people of Mulatto descent
People of Saint-Domingue
People of the Haitian Revolution
1744 births
1801 deaths
French planters
French slave owners
Free people of color